Sawan Biang is a 2008 Thai drama that aired on Channel 3.

Cast
Ken Theeradeth Wonpuapan as Kawee "Wee" Worawath - son of Khun Kid to his first wife, owing to his father having many wives after his mother's death he started to hate his father and turned into an arrogant cold guy who does not care about anyone, though he still remain good friends with Pat his ex-girlfriend and Sam. After meeting Narin he began to fall in love with her and brings back his kinder self though at first he just tries to blackmail and use Narin as a revenge to Leela, Narin's sister and his father's new wife who has a romantic feelings for him.
Ann Thongprasom as Narin - the loving sister of Leela and the only one who tries to back talk and fight with Kawee, but after Kawee raped her and she is pregnant with their child, Narin distances herself from her family and tries not to worry them. As Kawee begins to pursue her and will change for her and their child, Narin begins to fall for Kawee's kinder nature.
Natharika Thamapreedanan as Leela "Lee" - Worawath - Narin's elder sister and Khun Kid's new wife who harbors romantic feelings for Kawee and wanted revenge as well after Kawee embarrasses her in front of many people that led her into an accident. After knowing that Kawee uses her sister to get revenge she feels a little bit of jealousy towards Narin yet hated Kawee more for doing bad things to her sister eventually after knowing that Narin is pregnant with Kawee's child. At the end of the series she and Kawee reconcile and even helps him get back together with Narin.
Louis Scott as Pawan "Tom"

Supporting cast
Dilok Thong Wattana as Khun Kid Worawath - Kawee's father who despises him after having many wives
Jane Janesuda Parnto as Patrapapa "Pat" - Kawee's ex-girlfriend who after breaking up with Kawee still remain friends with him and is often Kawee's savior during his hard times.
Nithichai Yotamornsunthorn as Supajit "Sam" -

Actors 2008

Awards

International broadcast
 This lakorn aired in Vietnam on THVL1 beginning April 29, 2016, under the title Thiên đường tội lỗi.

Thai television soap operas
2000s Thai television series
2008 Thai television series debuts
2008 Thai television series endings
Channel 3 (Thailand) original programming